The Express (also: EXPRESS) is a German regional tabloid based in Cologne. It is published daily by DuMont Mediengruppe. The newspaper has local sections for Cologne, Düsseldorf and Bonn. It is also available in the surrounding region (Aachen, Mönchengladbach, Duisburg) without local section. The first edition of Express was published on 29 February 1964.

The newspaper had a circulation of 132,836 in the fourth quarter of 2015. It received several media awards. Among those was the European Newspaper Award 2014 (for newspaper series "Wir leben in Köln") and 2015 (for the special edition "FC Total"). It has a staff of around 70 editors. Editor-in-chief is Carsten Fiedler.

References

External links 
 Express.de
 Express at Dumont.de
 Express Tabloid Serbia

1964 establishments in West Germany
Daily newspapers published in Germany
German-language newspapers
Newspapers published in Cologne
Newspapers published in Serbia
Publications established in 1964